Kalgoorlieite (IMA2015-119) is a mineral from Kalgoorlie, Western Australia.

Kalgoorlieite is the fourth oxygen-free arsenic-tellurium mineral after benleonardite, debattistiite, and törnroosite.

It was discovered in 2015 by a Curtin University academic Dr Kirsten Rempel while she was checking samples in the Kalgoorlie School of Mines Museum, and declared a new mineral in 2016, after verification and classification.

References

Arsenic minerals
Telluride minerals
City of Kalgoorlie–Boulder
Monoclinic minerals
Minerals in space group 12
Minerals described in 2016